Oxyurichthys paulae, commonly known as the jester goby, is a species of goby known only from Cochin, India.

References

paulae
Fish of India
Taxa named by Frank Lorenzo Pezold III
Fish described in 1998